The 2022 GB Pro-Series Glasgow was a professional tennis tournament played on indoor hard courts. It was the twenty-ninth edition of the tournament which was part of the 2022 ITF Women's World Tennis Tour. It took place in Glasgow, United Kingdom between 17 and 23 October 2022.

Champions

Singles

  Yuriko Miyazaki def.  Heather Watson, 5–7, 7–6(7–5), 6–2

Doubles

  Freya Christie /  Ali Collins def.  Irene Burillo Escorihuela /  Andrea Lázaro García, 6–4, 6–1

Singles main draw entrants

Seeds

 1 Rankings are as of 10 October 2022.

Other entrants
The following players received wildcards into the singles main draw:
  Amarni Banks
  Anna Brogan
  Jasmine Conway
  Ella McDonald

The following player received entry into the singles main draw using a protected ranking:
  Maia Lumsden

The following players received entry from the qualifying draw:
  Emily Appleton
  Julie Belgraver
  Francesca Curmi
  Fiona Ganz
  Inès Ibbou
  Eliz Maloney
  Talia Neilson Gatenby
  Tamira Paszek

The following player received entry as a lucky loser:
  Maileen Nuudi

References

External links
 2022 GB Pro-Series Glasgow at ITFtennis.com

2022 ITF Women's World Tennis Tour
2022 in Scottish sport
October 2022 sports events in the United Kingdom
International sports competitions in Glasgow